Cyrtodactylus chungi is a species of gecko known only from two specimens found in the Ta Kou Nature Reserve in Binh Thuan province, Vietnam. It is also known as Chung's bent-toed gecko. C. chungi is part of the Cyrtodactylus irregularis species-group and is sister species to Cyrtodactylus cattienensis.

Both C. chungi's scientific and common names are named for Dr. Ngo Dac Chung, a herpetologist at Hue University.

References 

Gekkonidae
Reptiles described in 2021